Gilkyson is a surname. Notable people with the surname include:

Eliza Gilkyson (born 1950), Austin, Texas-based folk musician, daughter of Terry
Terry Gilkyson (1916–1999), American folk singer, composer, and lyricist, father of Eliza and Tony
Tony Gilkyson (born 1952), Los Angeles based musician, son of Terry

See also
Gilkes
Gilston